Moûtiers Cathedral is a Roman Catholic church in Moûtiers en Tarentaise, France. The cathedral is a national monument, and was formerly the seat of the Archdiocese of Tarentaise, which was abolished under the Concordat of 1801. It was afterwards the seat of the re-formed Bishopric of Tarentaise from 1825 until 1966, when the diocese of Tarentaise, Diocese of Saint-Jean-de-Maurienne and the Archdiocese of Chambéry were amalgamated to form the present Archdiocese of Chambéry, Maurienne and Tarentaise.

Sources

 Catholic Encyclopedia: Tarentaise
 Diocese of Tarentaise

Former cathedrals in France
Churches in Savoie